iZombie is an American television series developed by Rob Thomas and Diane Ruggiero-Wright for The CW. It is an adaptation of the comic book series of the same name created by Chris Roberson and Michael Allred and published by DC Comics under their Vertigo imprint. 

iZombie was officially picked up on May 8, 2014, and premiered on March 17, 2015. iZombie was renewed for a fifth and final season in May 2018.

Series overview

Episodes

Season 1 (2015)

Season 2 (2015–16)

Season 3 (2017)

Season 4 (2018)

Season 5 (2019)

Ratings

Overview

Season 1

Season 2

Season 3

Season 4

Season 5

References

External links
 

Lists of American action television series episodes
Lists of American comedy-drama television series episodes
Lists of American crime television series episodes
Lists of DC Comics television series episodes